Chippenham Preceptory was a preceptory in Cambridgeshire, England. It was established in 1184 and was dissolved in 1540.

References

Monasteries in Cambridgeshire
1184 establishments in England
Christian monasteries established in the 12th century
1540 disestablishments in England